The Clarity Tour was the second concert tour by German recording artist Kim Petras in support of her 2019 debut project Clarity. The tour was announced by Petras via her social media accounts on September 4, 2019. It started on 21 October 2019 in Vancouver, Canada and concluded on 11 February 2020 in London, United Kingdom.

Background and development 
The tour was announced on September 4, 2019, following the conclusion of Petras' debut tour, the Broken Tour, on the same day. It was initially scheduled to comprise 23 North American shows between 21 October and 8 December 2019 and to start in Vancouver, Canada and to conclude in San Diego, United States. Due to the original dates selling out, a second night of shows was later added in both New York and Boston, bringing the total number of North American shows to 25.

On October 14, 2019, a week prior to the start of the tour, a European leg was announced. It was scheduled to comprise 13 additional shows between January 24 and February 11, 2020 and to start in Amsterdam, Netherlands and to conclude in London, United Kingdom, however, the show in Glasgow on February 5, 2020 was later canceled due to illness.

Set list 
This set list is representative of the European leg of the tour and the performance on January 24, 2020. 

{{Div col|content=#"Clarity"
"Meet the Parents"
"Blow It All"
"I Don't Want It At All"
"Hillside Boys"
"Unlock It" / "Click"
"Purgatory" 
"There Will Be Blood"
"Wrong Turn"
"<demons>"
"Death By Sex" 
"Close Your Eyes"
"Everybody Dies"
"Human" (The Killers cover)
"Reminds Me"
"Icy"
"Do Me"
"Can't Do Better"
Encore
"Heart to Break"
"1, 2, 3 dayz up"
"Sweet Spot"}}

Tour dates

References

2019 concert tours
2020 concert tours